Dannemora is a Swedish place name, which was used for various places:

 Dannemora, Sweden, a village with 200 inhabitants, from which the others have got their name
 Dannemora Minerals, a Swedish mining company located in the county of the above village
 Dannemora mine, a famous historical iron ore mine near the above village
 Dannemora (village), New York
  Dannemora Prison, colloquial name for the Clinton Correctional Facility in the above village
 Escape at Dannemora, American TV series
 Dannemora (town), New York
 Dannemora, New Zealand, a residential suburb in Auckland